Mahiyanganaya is a town situated close to the Mahaweli River in Badulla District, Uva Province of Sri Lanka. It is said that Gautama Buddha visited Mahiyanganaya on the Duruthu full moon poya day in order to settle a dispute arose between Yakkas and Nagas (two tribes which then inhabited the area) and this was his first ever visit to Sri Lanka. Then the Buddha preached Dhamma to Sumana Saman, a leader in this area, to whom the Buddha gave a handful of his hair relic so that people could worship. After that Sumana Saman (now the god Sumana Saman) built a golden chethiya in which the sacred hair relic was deposited. Later on about seven chethiyas were built over the original golden chethiya from time to time, the last one being built by the King Dutugemunu. As such, this historic town is a very sacred place for Buddhists.

The majority of the people in this area are engaged in paddy cultivation being the main economic activity.

The name
Mahiyangana is a Pali word (in Sinhalese Bintenna) which means flat land. It is situated eastwards to the steep eastern falls of central hills. The relative flatness of the area can be seen while traveling on the road from Kandy to Padiyathalawa across Hunnasgiriya and famous 18 hairpin bends.

Transport
The nearest railway station is Badulla. Mahiyangana is connected to cities and towns like Kandy, Badulla, Polonnaruwa, Ampara and Monaragala by main roads.

See also
 Mahiyangana Raja Maha Vihara
 Transport in Sri Lanka
 Bibile

References

External links
Mahiyangana Info
අලූතින් ඉදීවන දහඅටවංගුවේ කථාව සොරබොර වැව හැදූ බුලතා 
The Buddha visited Mahiyangana in ninth month of his enlightenment
MAHIYANGANA The old city of devils
Significance of Duruthu Full Moon Poya Day
The unchanging splendour of Bintenna!
cultural surrounding of Mahiyangana
Recapturing and reconstruction of Mahiyangana

Towns in Badulla District